The IAR 14 is a Romanian low-wing monoplane fighter-trainer aircraft designed before World War II.

Design and development
After rejection of IAR 12, Romanian officials did not want to discourage eventual national aircraft production. Therefore, in early 1933, an unofficial message was forwarded from top levels to Brasov, essentially indicating that a small number of fighter-trainers would be purchased by the air force. The I.A.R. team immediately began to work on a new type, designated I.A.R. 14, still based on the experience gained with previous designs

The airplane was designed by IAR design bureau in 1933 and was an evolution from the IAR 12 prototype. It was a  cantilever low-winged monoplane with a spatted main undercarriage with V-form legs and a single, open cockpit over the wing. The tail had been modified once more and the control surfaces were balanced. The pilot's head rest was not fitted with the anti-crash pylon, typical to the precedent prototypes. The engine was mounted on welded steel bearers attached to a duralumin fireproof bulkhead. The wings were built around twin duralumin spars and pine and plywood ribs and had plywood leading edges. The centre section, let into the fuselage underside was duralumin covered, outer sections and ailerons fabric-covered. The fixed tail was built of pine and plywood-covered, the moving surfaces duralumin with fabric cover.

The aircraft was equipped with the IAR LD 450 powerplant, produced under license by IAR, that also equipped the IAR 12. The first flight took place in June 1933. In September 1933, an order for 20 aircraft was placed.

Operators

Royal Romanian Air Force

Specifications (IAR 14)

See also

References

Bibliography

1930s Romanian fighter aircraft
14
Low-wing aircraft
Single-engined tractor aircraft
Aircraft first flown in 1933